Qawme Dehqan is an area of Beshud II in Wardak Province in central Afghanistan. It is located at 34°10'60N 67°24'0E with an altitude of 2757 metres (9048 feet).
The Qawme people are a Hazara tribe.

See also
Qowm-e Dehqān

References

Populated places in Maidan Wardak Province